Buckland Athletic Football Club is a football club based in Newton Abbot, Devon, England.

History
The club was established in 1977 as a youth team and joined the Torbay Pioneer League. After winning the Devon Youth Cup, the club entered senior football, joining Division Three of the Devon & Exeter League in 1987. They won the division at the first attempt, and were promoted to Division Two. They were promoted again the following season, moving up to Division One.

A fourth-place finish in Division One in 1992–93 saw Buckland promoted to the Premier Division. They went on to win the Premier Division title and Football Express Cup in 1994–95, and the East Devon Senior Cup the following season. The club won the Premier Division Cup in 1997–98, and after retaining it the following season, they were Premier Division champions again in 1999–2000.

After winning their second Premier Division title, Buckland moved up to the Devon County League, and were runners-up in their first season. In 2007 the league merged with the South Western League to form the South West Peninsula League, with Buckland placed in the Premier Division. They were Premier Division champions in 2009–10 and retained the title the following season. After finishing as Premier Division runners-up in 2011–12, the club were promoted to the Premier Division of the Western League. In 2014–15 they were Western League runners-up.

Ground
The club initially played at Sandringham Park, before moving to Decoy during the 1990–91 season. Within two years they moved to Homers Lane. In 2005 the club relocated to their current Homers Heath ground on Kingkerswell Road. The ground was officially opened on 13 July by Steve Perryman prior to a friendly match against Plymouth Argyle.

Honours
South West Peninsula League
Premier Division champions 2009–10, 2010–11
Throgmorton Cup winners 2009–10
Charity Bowl winners 2009¢, 2011–12
Devon and Exeter League
Premier Division champions 1994–95, 1999–2000
Division Three champions 1987–88
Premier Cup winners 1997–98, 1998–99
Devon St Lukes Bowl
Winners 2010–11, 2011–12
East Devon Senior Cup
Winners 1995–96
Football Express Cup
Winners 1994–95

Management staff

Records
Best FA Cup performance: Second qualifying round, 2012–13
Best FA Vase performance: Quarter-finals, 2016–17

See also
Buckland Athletic F.C. players
Buckland Athletic F.C. managers

References

External links
Official website

 
Football clubs in England
Football clubs in Devon
Association football clubs established in 1977
1977 establishments in England
Newton Abbot
Devon and Exeter Football League
Devon County League
South West Peninsula League
Western Football League